Jan Hájek was the defending champion; however, he chose to compete in Rome instead.Lukáš Rosol won in the final 7–5, 4–6, 7–6(4) against Ivan Dodig.

Seeds

Draw

Finals

Top half

Bottom half

References
Main Draw
Qualifying Draw

Prosperita Open - Singles
2010 Singles